Wu Zaochi (born 1903) was a Chinese born politician.

Born in 1903, a native of Taishan, Guangdong, Wu was educated in the United States, where he earned a doctorate in political science from Johns Hopkins University. He took office as a member of the Legislative Yuan in March 1947. In later life, Wu moved to the United States.

References

1903 births
Year of death missing
Members of the 1st Legislative Yuan
Republic of China politicians from Guangdong
People from Taishan, Guangdong
Chinese legal scholars
Johns Hopkins University alumni
Chinese emigrants to the United States
China Democratic Socialist Party politicians
20th-century Chinese politicians